Sepia hieronis is a species of cuttlefish native to the southeastern Atlantic Ocean and southwestern Indian Ocean, specifically southern Namibia, from approximately 27°S to Port Alfred, South Africa, and east Africa from 17°S to Kenya and Mozambique. It is also present in the Saya-de-Malha Bank. It lives at depths of between 43 and 500 m, although it is most abundant at 110 to 250 m depth.

Sepia hieronis grows to a mantle length of 70 mm.

The type specimen was collected off Cape Town, South Africa (32°32' to 33°03'S, 17°29' to 17°42'E). It is deposited at The Natural History Museum in London.

References

External links

Cuttlefish
Molluscs described in 1924